Chris Thompson may refer to:

Sportspeople
 Chris Thompson (swimmer) (born 1978), American Olympic swimmer
 Chris Thompson (runner) (born 1981), British athlete
 Chris Thompson (cornerback) (born 1982), American football player
 Chris Thompson (running back) (born 1990), American football player
 Chris Thompson (darts player) (born 1971), English darts player
 Chris Thompson (footballer, born 1960) (1960–2012), English footballer
 Chris Thompson (footballer, born 1982), English footballer
 Chris Thompson (cricketer) (born 1987), English cricketer
 Chris Thompson (wide receiver) (born 1994), American football player
 Chris Thompson (golfer) (born 1976), American golfer

Others
 Chris Thompson (English musician) (born 1948), English singer and guitarist
 Chris Thompson (TV producer) (1952–2015), American director, producer, and writer
 Chris Thompson (Canadian musician) (born 1971), Canadian musician

See also 
 Christopher Thompson (disambiguation)
 Christian Thompson (disambiguation)
 Chris Thomson (born 1985), Australian rugby union footballer
 Christopher Thomson, 1st Baron Thomson (1875-1930), British Army officer and politician